Hagnaby is a small village in the East Lindsey district of Lincolnshire, England.

Hagnaby is listed in the 1086 Domesday Book as "Hagenebi", with 23 households. In 1086 the Lord of the Manor was Ivo Tallboys.

The church, dedicated to Saint Andrew, is a Grade II listed building dating from the late 18th century with 1881 and 1903 alterations, and consists of render over red brick.

A 19th-century mansion house assumed the name "Hagnaby Priory" although there is no historical record of any priory in the vicinity. In 1964 Pevsner stated that remains of a large 1835 Tudor and Gothic style house (Hagnaby Priory) by Charles Kirk existed as part of a current office wing.

References

External links

Villages in Lincolnshire
East Lindsey District